Bruno Miguel Carapeto Reis (born 20 July 1999) is a Portuguese footballer who plays as a midfielder for Portimonense.

Club career
Reis signed his first professional contract with his childhood club Portimonense S.C. on 2 November 2017. Reis made his professional debut for Portimonense in a 2-0 Primeira Liga loss to Vitória S.C. on 16 February 2019.

References

External links

ZeroZero Profile

1999 births
People from Portimão
Sportspeople from Faro District
Living people
Portuguese footballers
Association football midfielders
Portimonense S.C. players
Primeira Liga players